Camsell Portage is a northern settlement of 37 people, located on the north-central shore of Lake Athabasca. The northern settlement is an unincorporated community in the Northern Saskatchewan Administration District.

Camsell is one of the few remaining fly-in communities served by the school division. During winter, residents can travel to Uranium City by snowmobile, and there is also a road connecting Camsell Portage to the community of Waterloo Lake. The school closed on June 26, 2007 due to low enrolment. Despite its remote location, Camsell Portage has satellite television and high speed internet services.

The Athabasca System Hydroelectric Stations operated by SaskPower east of the community include the Charlot River Dam and Power Station, the Waterloo Dam and Power Station and the Wellington Dam and Power Station.

Demographics 

See also 
Saskatchewan Highway 999
Charlot River Airport

References 

Designated places in Saskatchewan
Division No. 18, Unorganized, Saskatchewan
Northern settlements in Saskatchewan
Road-inaccessible communities of Saskatchewan
Lake Athabasca